Tracy Andrus (born September 26, 1962) is a criminologist who is recognized for the development of two crime theories —"Enviroecogenetics" and "Broke Theory." He earned four college degrees and became the first African American in the United States to earn a PhD in juvenile justice.

Early life and education

Andrus is a native of Crowley, Louisiana, and is the twelfth child of Alice V. Andrus and Warren Lee Andrus. He was in the third grade when schools in Louisiana were integrated, and racial discrimination led to very different views among the Liberalism liberals and Conservatism conservatives of the time. His childhood home was destroyed by fire when he was in kindergarten. He was active in sports throughout his early life, playing football, baseball and basketball. He was also active in academic clubs in junior high and high school.

Andrus graduated from Crowley High School in 1981 with honors and attended Louisiana College in Pineville, Louisiana, where he graduated in 2000 with a degree in Criminal justice. He later graduated from the University of Louisiana at Monroe in 2001 with a master's degree in criminal justice. On May 7, 2005, Andrus completed his doctorate at Prairie View A&M University became the first African American in the U.S. to earn a Ph.D. in juvenile justice. Andrus also earned his prior learning assessment certificate and his mastery certificate from the University of Chicago and the Council on Adult and Experiential Learning.

Dr. Tracy Andrus is the President/CEO of Tracy Andrus Foundation (TAF) in Marshall, Texas. TAF received 1.9 million dollars in 2021 to assist citizens in East Texas with rent, utilities and mortgage assistance. TAF also rehabilitated and converted a former jail facility into an emergency shelter that currently housed up to 16 people. TAF also provides laundry and shower services to the homeless and underserved at-risk families. Children and families are able to wash their clothes daily, so no child has to attend school with soiled clothes and no adult has to wear soiled clothes. TAF also provides meals for anyone in need in the communities that it serves! TAF provides men, women and children clothing to its program participants. Homeless persons can come in from 10AM-2PM and shower M-F. Tracy Andrus Foundation also operates Heather's Houses which are safe houses for domestic violence survivors that are named in memory of his daughter Heather Dawn Mouton who was killed by her husband in 2018. Heather's law was signed into law in 2019 by Governor John Bel Edwards to strengthen restraining laws and protective orders in Louisiana. Drs Sonya and Tracy Andrus dedicated three safe houses for domestic violence survivors in 2020 and was awarded 1.1 million in 2022 to build 8 new safe houses by the state of Texas. TAF was also approved by the Texas Workforce Commission to operate Gateway Technical School which will offer certificates in Construction, HVAC, Plumbing, and electric. TAF is also able to offer certificates in certificate of nursing assistant, culinary arts, childcare apprenticeships and other areas. 

Recently TAF purchased the historic Presbyterian Church in Marshall that will house the new Gateway Childcare Center. Dr. Tracy Andrus' goal is to provide a wholistic approach to rehabilitation and reintegration! Dr. Andrus says that everyone is a seed! When and how we grow depends on our environment and how much sunlight, the kind of soil and the amount of water we get! All seeds can grow if they are placed in the right environments! There is a forest in every seed, we just have to work on methods to get them out! For more information or to make a donation to the Tracy Andrus Foundation, please visit www.tracyandrusfoundation.com

Career
After being sentenced to 57 years in prison for check kiting, Andrus spent only three years in prison and was released in 1994. This started his interest in the criminal justice system. Andrus spends at least 20 weeks out of the year traveling abroad speaking to disadvantaged youth who are children of felons or have parents currently incarcerated in prison. Andrus is the director of criminal justice at Wiley College in Marshall, Texas. Andrus received a grant from the United States Department of Homeland Security in 2010 and 2011 to study "Equal Protection of the law in the Era of Terrorism" and spent ten weeks in Seattle with two student researchers. Andrus received additional funding for $50,000 from DHS to continue his study in 2011. Andrus was awarded a grant from the Sam Taylor Foundation to track law enforcement killings in the United States in 2014. In 2015 Andrus applied for and was granted acceptance to participate in the Second Chance Pell Initiative through the Department of Education. Andrus was named executive director of Wiley College's Second Chance Pell Program, which offered degrees to offenders who were incarcerated in prison. Wiley College was one of only three HBCUs granted acceptance into the Second Chance Pell Program during its initial launch.

Andrus is credited with developing two evolving theories on crime—Enviroecogenetics and Broke Theory—and is the author of three books: Beneath the Skin of Black Folks, From Prisoner to Ph.D., and Why Are So Many Black Folks In Jail? Dr. Andrus is Director of Criminal Justice at Wiley College and President and CEO of the Council On Higher Education Solutions For Adults (CHESA). Dr. Andrus is also President and CEO of Tracy Andrus Foundation.

Andrus' Enviroecogenetics theory suggests that criminal activity can be explained by analyzing three dominant variables: 
 the environments in which individuals are raised, 
 the economic status of individuals and their families, and 
 the genetic makeup of individuals and their families.

Andrus suggests that individuals who are raised in low socioeconomic environments are predisposed to a greater extent to become engaged in criminal activity. According to Andrus, economics, specifically the lack of money, is the strongest predictor of an individual's likelihood to engage in criminal activity, whilst the reasons can be varied.

Andrus was elected president of the Southwestern Association of Criminal Justice in 2008, and is an ordained minister and pastor of Edward Chapel MBC in Marshall, Texas. Andrus was elected vice chair of the Minority and Women Section of the Academy of Criminal Justice Sciences which is the largest criminal justice conference

Published by Createspace, Why Are So Many Black Folks In Jail? was released in December 2011 and raises questions about the functions of incarceration in the United States. Andrus is an advocate for African Americans and felons in the US. Andrus is also the author of Beneath the Skin of Black Folks, From Prisoner to PhD and a Macro Analysis of Poverty and African American Incarceration. Andrus published his book "Ex Felon Survival Guide" 2013 and in 2015, "Customer Service - The Reason Some HBCU's are Destined to Fail.

 References 

     5. https://www.marshallnewsmessenger.com/business/progress-dr-tracy-andrus-works-to-transform-east-texas-for-the-better/article_75e21a28-9028-11ec-845b-877c5ecbe24f.html

Further reading
Houston Chronicle... May 7, 2005 "PhD Earns Place In Black History"
Houston Chronicle..... 2003, The Man and His Message.
Tracy Andrus (2003)Beneath The Skin Of Black Folks - How Black Folks In America Really Feel. Northstar Press
Tracy Andrus (2005) Dissertation - A Macro Analysis of Poverty and African American Incarceration''.
Create Space (2011) Why Are So Many Black Folks In Jail.
Tracy Andrus (2013) Ex-Felon Survival Guide
Tracy Andrus and Sonya Andrus (2011) Awarding and Evaluating Credit For Prior Learning
https://www.marshallnewsmessenger.com/business/progress-dr-tracy-andrus-works-to-transform-east-texas-for-the-better/article_75e21a28-9028-11ec-845b-877c5ecbe24f.html
 Invisible Systems - What they have always Known - 2022 - Amazon (Dr. Tracy Andrus)

1962 births
Living people
People from Lafayette, Louisiana
People from Crowley, Louisiana
American criminologists